Donald Campbell Urquhart (1848 – 6 August 1911) was an Australian politician.

Early life 
He was born in London.

Political career 
In 1893, Urquhart was elected to the Tasmanian House of Assembly as the Free Trade member for Cumberland. His election was declared void in December 1893, but in 1894 he won election to the seat of Montagu. Following a redistribution in 1900 he became the member for Zeehan, holding it until he was defeated in 1903. He served a final term as the member for Devonport from 1906 until 1909, when he contested Darwin unsuccessfully after the introduction of proportional representation. Urquhart was a minister from 1897 to 1899 and served as Treasurer from 1906 to 1909.

References

1848 births
1911 deaths
Free Trade Party politicians
Members of the Tasmanian House of Assembly
English emigrants to Australia
People from London